Thomson Park is a multi-use sports stadium in Navua District, Fiji. It has a capacity of 1,000  and is currently used by local association football club Navua F.C. for their home matches.

In March 2011, the Fiji FA ruled that no further league games could be held at the stadium until a fence perimeter had been installed for player safety.

Thomson Park hosted international football matches on Wednesday, 16 August 2011 when Fiji played Samoa. The two countries' women's teams also played each other. Fiji men won 3-0 and their women's team won 2-0.

References

External links
 http://www.worldfootball.net/spielorte/thomson-park-navua/5/ - Aerial view of stadium

Football venues in Fiji
Multi-purpose stadiums in Fiji